Alan Mandell (born Albert Mandell on December 27, 1927) is a Canadian-American actor known for playing Rabbi Marshak in the Coen Brothers' 2009 film A Serious Man. With several decades of experience as a stage actor, he is especially acclaimed as an interpreter of the works of Samuel Beckett.

Life
Albert Mandell was born to a Jewish family in Toronto, Ontario in 1927. He acted on stage in both Canada and the United States, building a reputation in San Francisco's theater scene in the 1950s. In 1968 he legally changed his given name to Alan to avoid being confused with noted mobster Albert Anastasia.

Mandell's association with Beckett began in 1957, with a production of Waiting for Godot at the San Francisco Actor's Workshop. He subsequently played Lucky in a production of Godot directed by Beckett himself.

Outside of Beckett, Mandell has acted in productions of Harold Pinter's No Man's Land and Arthur Miller's The Price. In 2007 he appeared as Juror #9 in a Los Angeles production of Twelve Angry Men, directed by Scott Ellis and costarring Richard Thomas and George Wendt.

Filmography

Film

Television

References

External links

1927 births
American male film actors
American male stage actors
American male television actors
Canadian expatriates in the United States
Jewish American male actors
Jewish Canadian male actors
Living people
Male actors from San Francisco
Male actors from Toronto
Samuel Beckett